Ludovico Giamagna, O.P. (1594–1634) was a Roman Catholic prelate who served as Bishop of Ston (1632–1634).

Biography
Ludovico Giamagna was born in Ragusa and ordained a priest in the Order of Preachers. On 24 Nov 1632, he was appointed by Pope Urban VIII as Bishop of Ston. He served as Bishop of Ston until his death in July 1634.

References 

1594 births
1634 deaths
17th-century Roman Catholic bishops in Croatia
Bishops appointed by Pope Urban VIII
Dominican bishops